Zoe Louise Ball (born 23 November 1970) is a British radio and television presenter.  She was the first female host of both Radio 1 Breakfast and The Radio 2 Breakfast Show for the BBC, and presented the 1990s children's show Live & Kicking, alongside Jamie Theakston from 1996–1999.

Ball was a contestant in the third series of Strictly Come Dancing. Following this, in 2011 she replaced Claudia Winkleman as host of the BBC Two spin-off show Strictly Come Dancing: It Takes Two until her departure in 2021. Ball also hosted the Strictly Come Dancing Live Tour in 2011 and 2015.

In 2018, Ball was announced as the new The Radio 2 Breakfast Show host and took over from Chris Evans in January 2019.

Early life
Zoe Ball was born in Blackpool, Lancashire, and grew up in Farnham Common, Buckinghamshire. She is the daughter of the children's TV presenter Johnny Ball and his wife Julia née Anderson. The couple divorced when Zoe was two.

Ball was educated at Heston Junior School in the district of Hounslow between 1975 and 1978. Her family then moved to Farnham Common in Buckinghamshire. She attended Farnham Common First School and Farnham Common Middle School before moving to Holy Cross Convent School in Chalfont St Peter and Amersham College of Art and Technology.

She also attended the Young Theatre at Beaconsfield where she trained as an actress. Her first TV appearance was as a child in the studio audience of the 1980s Saturday morning children's show, Saturday Superstore, on which her father was appearing as a guest.

Career

Television

Ball began her television career as a runner at Granada Television and researcher for the Cool Cube on BSkyB. She then worked as a researcher for quiz shows for two years. Her presenting jobs have included hosting The Big Breakfast and The Priory on Channel 4, BBC One's Saturday morning children's programme Live & Kicking, and the pre-school programme Playdays. In 1994, Ball presented SMart with Mark Speight and Jay Burridge until she left in 1996. In 1995, Ball hosted Fully Booked for the first series. Between 1996 and 1998, she was a regular presenter on Top of the Pops, usually alternating with fellow presenters and DJs Jayne Middlemiss and Jo Whiley. 

Between 1999 and 2001, she was a co-host with Jamie Theakston on the Wednesday night chat/music show The Priory, which was commissioned by Chris Evans's then production company Ginger Productions.

Ball co-hosted the 2002 Brit Awards with Frank Skinner, following which motherhood meant that she took less television work. In 2005, she co-hosted the BBC reality show Strictly Dance Fever. In 2006, Ball co-hosted the ITV programme Extinct, alongside Trevor McDonald.

In January 2007, she presented the second series of ITV's Soapstar Superstar, taking over from Fern Britton and Ben Shephard, who hosted the first series. In March 2007, she hosted the ITV talent search Grease Is the Word.

Alongside Jamie Theakston, Ball presented Channel 5's quiz series Britain's Best Brain in 2009. Ball has guest presented several episodes of The One Show as a stand-in for Alex Jones.

On 4 August 2013, as hostess of a special entitled Doctor Who Live: The Next Doctor, she revealed Peter Capaldi as the incoming Twelfth Doctor and hosted his first interview in that capacity.

In November 2013, she co-hosted the BBC One Children in Need telethon, alongside Sir Terry Wogan, Fearne Cotton, Nick Grimshaw and Tess Daly. In 2014, Ball presented a BBC Two spin-off from The Voice UK called The Voice: Louder on Two. The show aired for one series of ten episodes.

In 2015, Ball hosted EastEnders: Backstage Live, a spin-off show during the EastEnders live week. She co-presented the BBC Young Dancer competition with Darcey Bussell on BBC Two.

She also narrated two ITV Specials, The Nation's Favourite '70s Number One and The Nation's Favourite '80s Number One as well as the BBC One series Don't Tell the Bride. In 2016, Ball co-presented Can't Touch This, a Saturday night game show for BBC One, alongside Ashley Banjo. She also narrated The Nation's Favourite Carpenters Song.

She guest-presented an episode of Film 2016. In 2017, Ball co-presented The Big Family Cooking Showdown with Nadiya Hussain on BBC Two.

In 2020 and 2021, Ball appeared alongside her son Woody Fred Cook on Series 2 and 3 of Celebrity Gogglebox.

In 2021, Ball appeared on The Masked Dancer, masked as Llama. She was the sixth celebrity to be unmasked.

Strictly Come Dancing and It Takes Two

In October 2005, Ball became a contestant on the third series of the BBC One talent show Strictly Come Dancing, where she was partnered by Ian Waite. Ball and Waite were ranked in third place; they also scored 38/40 (including two tens) for three dances in the series and one in the Christmas special.

In 2011, she took over from Claudia Winkleman as the host of Strictly Come Dancings sister show It Takes Two, airing every weeknight on BBC Two; in 2014, whilst Winkleman was on leave after her daughter suffered serious burn injuries, Ball co-hosted the main show. On 17 May 2021, Ball announced she was leaving her role as presenter after 10 years.

Radio

Although known primarily for her TV work, Ball first worked in radio, after she became co-host of Radio 1 Breakfast on BBC Radio 1 in October 1997 with Kevin Greening. She became the sole host, the first female DJ to do so. At this time, her hard-drinking, hard-partying lifestyle contributed to the identification of the so-called "ladette culture" of the late 1990s. She was twice warned by the BBC for swearing on the radio.

Ball left BBC Radio 1 in March 2000 to start a family and a new chapter. Her final show was on 10 March 2000; she was succeeded by Sara Cox.

Ball returned to radio in mid-2002 when she joined London radio station Xfm, where she presented the weekday drivetime show until December 2003. In January 2004, she took over a Friday evening music show for the station. She also stood in for Ricky Gervais while he filmed the second series of The Office. She left Xfm at the end of 2004.

In September 2007, she returned to BBC Radio and co-hosted a show with Sara Cox, celebrating 40 years of BBC Radio 1 and BBC Radio 2.

From 2006, she provided relief presenting duties for BBC Radio 2, fronted specialist documentaries, sat in for Dermot O'Leary for three weeks in February 2006, and co-presented (with Danny Baker) the hastily conceived replacement for Jonathan Ross' Saturday morning show, in the wake of Ross's suspension due to Sachsgate in 2008.

In 2009, Ball became the usual relief presenter for Ken Bruce's weekday mid-morning show on BBC Radio 2. She also began hosting the Saturday breakfast show from 6:00 a.m. to 8:00 a.m. on the network from 6 June 2009 as part of a shake-up of weekend programming at Radio 2. Ball left Radio 2 for a while as her last show was broadcast on Saturday 28 January 2012. Her replacement in that slot was Anneka Rice.

Ball covered The Radio 2 Breakfast Show for Chris Evans on several occasions.

From 4 March 2017 until 22 December 2018, Ball returned to Radio 2 on permanent basis where she presented the Saturday afternoon slot on BBC Radio 2 between 3–6pm, taking over from Dermot O'Leary. 

On 3 October 2018, she was announced by Chris Evans as the new host of The Radio 2 Breakfast Show, which began on 14 January 2019. Rylan Clark replaced Ball in the Saturday mid-afternoon slot.

Personal life
Whilst at BBC Radio 1, Ball began a relationship with the DJ and musician Norman Cook (also known as Fatboy Slim). The couple married at Babington House in Somerset in August 1999.  In 2003, the couple split up when Ball revealed that she had had an affair; they later reconciled. The couple have a son, Woody Fred Cook (born 2000), and a daughter, Nelly (born 2010).  On 24 September 2016, the couple announced their separation after 18 years together and later divorced.
Zoe's long-term partner Michael Reed is a fashion model and a carpenter; They met through a mutual friend in 2017.

Charity work
In 2014, she supported Marks & Spencer and Oxfam's Love Mum campaign.

In March 2018, Ball took part in the 'Hardest Ride Home' challenge, which saw her cycling from Blackpool to Brighton to raise money for Sport Relief and mental health awareness. She set off on 5 March for five days. Highlights of the challenge were broadcast in a one-off documentary, airing on 21 March 2018 on BBC One. As a result of the challenge, she was able to raise a total of £1,198,012.

Filmography

Radio

Television

References

External links

 
 The Zoe Ball Breakfast Show (BBC Radio 2)
 @ZoeTheBall Verified Twitter Account

1970 births
BBC Radio 1 presenters
BBC Radio 2 presenters
British children's television presenters
English radio DJs
English television presenters
Living people
People from Blackpool
People from Beaconsfield
Comic Relief people
Top of the Pops presenters